is a Japanese screenwriter. He is also a publisher and an editor of the Eiga Geijutsu magazine and a professor of the Japan Institute of the Moving Image.

Career
Arai won the Mainichi Film Award for best screenplay for the film W's Tragedy in 1984. He wrote the screenplay for Junji Sakamoto's KT (2001), and also penned the screenplays for Ryuichi Hiroki's films Vibrator (2003) and It's Only Talk (2005). In 2013, he wrote the scripts for Junichi Inoue's A Woman and War and Shinji Aoyama's The Backwater.

His published but unfilmed scenario, has been called lesescenario by figures such as the director Shinichiro Sawai.

Filmography

As screenwriter
 Woman with Red Hair (1979)
 Enrai (1981)
 W's Tragedy (1984)
 The City That Never Sleeps: Shinjuku Shark (1993)
 Body and Soul (1997)
 KT (2002)
 Vibrator (2003)
 It's Only Talk (2005)
 Someday (2011)
 A Woman and War (2013)
 The Backwater (2013)
 Unlucky Woman's Blues (2014)
 Kabukicho Love Hotel (2014)

As director
 Body and Soul (1997)
 It Feels So Good (2020)

Bibliography

See also
Kazuo Kasahara

References

External links

Japanese screenwriters
Living people
1947 births
Place of birth missing (living people)